is a former Japanese football player.

Playing career
Nasu was born in Osaka on December 29, 1978. After graduating from high school, he joined Regional Leagues club Sagawa Express Osaka in 1997. He played for the club in 2 seasons. In 2002, he joined J2 League club Ventforet Kofu. Although his original position is defensive midfielder, he became a regular as left side back. Although he could not play many matches in 2004, he became a regular as defensive midfielder in 2005 and Ventforet was promoted to J1 League end of 2005 season. However he could hardly play in the match from 2006. In 2008, he moved to newly was promoted to J2 League club, FC Gifu. He played many matches as regular left side back. He retired end of 2008 season.

Club statistics

References

External links

1978 births
Living people
Association football people from Osaka Prefecture
Sportspeople from Osaka
Japanese footballers
J1 League players
J2 League players
Ventforet Kofu players
FC Gifu players
Japanese expatriate footballers
Association football midfielders